Peter Marksman (c. 1817–1892) was a Native American Methodist minister, active in Michigan among the Potawatomi Indians.  He was member of the L'Anse Band of Lake Superior Chippewa. His Indian name was Ma-dwa-gwun-a-yaush, from the Ojibwe Madwegwaneyaash, meaning "[Arrow]-Feathers Are Heard in the Breeze," which is an indicator of an expert archer/marksman. Consequently, when he converted to Christianity, he chose "Marksman" as his surname. As a chief, he was a signatory to the 1847 Treaty of Fond du Lac and the 1854 Treaty of La Pointe. His wife's name was "Hannah", to which the Hannahville Indian Community chose to be named after her in honor of both Marksman and his wife. He died March 28, 1892, aged about 75 years.

External links
Brief biography of Peter Marksman
Brief history of Potawatamie in Hannahville, Michigan.
The Indian Convert, a letter from Peter Marksman to Bishop Morris.  The Ladies' Repository.  Cincinnati: December, 1842.  P. 361.

Converts to Christianity
Ojibwe people
Native American leaders
1810s births
1892 deaths
Year of birth uncertain
19th-century American clergy
Native American people from Michigan